Microcytheridae is a family of crustaceans belonging to the order Podocopida.

Genera:
 Cocoonocythere Zhao
 Hanaicythere Yajima, 1987
 Microcythere Mueller, 1894

References

Podocopida